Waybread may refer to:
 Plantago major, a plant
 Lembas, or "elvish waybread," a fictional variety of bread in the works of J.R.R. Tolkien